Eretmocera contermina is a moth of the family Scythrididae. It was described by Edward Meyrick in 1926. It is found in Namibia and South Africa (Gauteng).

The wingspan is 10–11 mm. Adults have been recorded on wing in December and March.

References

contermina
Moths described in 1926